Amorphomerus is a genus of beetles in the family Carabidae, containing the following species:

 Amorphomerus boivini Jeannel, 1948
 Amorphomerus chaudoiri 
 Amorphomerus raffrayi (Chaudoir, 1878)

References

Orthogoniinae